Micah D. Fowler (born March 5, 1998) is an American actor. He portrayed the lead of the ABC sitcom Speechless (2016–2019).

Early life
The younger brother of actress Kelsey Fowler, he grew up in Barnegat Township, New Jersey. He grew up performing in local theater productions along with his sister. After his sister started taking roles on Broadway, Fowler thought he might like to advance his acting career as well.

Career
Micah D. Fowler started pursuing acting at the age of 5, which led him to roles on Blue's Clues and Sesame Street. He booked his role for Labor Day at age thirteen. For his most recent role, as "JJ DiMeo" on Speechless, he found out he booked the role on his eighteenth birthday. In an interview with People magazine, Fowler said it was the "best birthday present ever!"

Regarding his role on Speechless, he said it is a challenge to play JJ. Although Fowler is able to speak, the JJ character does not speak, so Fowler has to compensate with dramatic facial expressions and body movements. It's said that Fowler's humor gets the show's biggest laughs. He said he sometimes just wants to blurt out what he is feeling or saying. Fowler and the character he portrays both have cerebral palsy, and he is one of few actors with a disability playing a character with a disability on primetime network television.

Ambassador for the Cerebral Palsy Foundation
When not performing, Fowler devotes his time as an ambassador for the Cerebral Palsy Foundation (CPF). After each episode of Speechless, the CPF's website posts content and short informational videos about cerebral palsy. Fowler encourages, "So the next time you watch Speechless, take 10 minutes to check out their post for the night."

Personal life
When taking the role for Speechless, Fowler had to move from New Jersey to Los Angeles and also missed much of his sled hockey season and most of his senior year.

While Fowler had previously been somewhat averse to social media, after landing the role, he joined both Instagram and Twitter in an effort to promote the show.

Growing up he said he was a huge fan of movies and television saying, "I couldn't help but notice the lack of characters dealing with disabilities." In the future, Fowler even hopes to be in a Star Wars film or a Marvel movie.

Filmography
 Blue's Clues (2005)
 Sesame Street (2006)
 2 Lives: 2 Miles Apart (2012)
 Labor Day (2013)
 Speechless (2016–2019)

References

External links

1998 births
21st-century American male actors
Living people
People with cerebral palsy
People from Barnegat Township, New Jersey
Male actors from New Jersey
Male actors from Los Angeles
Actors with disabilities
American male television actors